The Ley class was a class of inshore minehunter built for the Royal Navy in the mid-1950s. They had pennant numbers in the series M2001. Eleven ships were built in the early 1950s, most of which were subsequently disarmed and used as training vessels, RNXS tenders, URNU vessels etc.

Unlike traditional minesweepers, they were not equipped for sweeping moored or magnetic mines. Their work was to locate individual mines and neutralise them. This was a then new role, and the class was configured for working in the shallow water of rivers, estuaries and shipping channels.

They were of composite construction, that is, wood and non-ferrous metals, to give a low magnetic signature, important in a vessel that may be dealing with magnetically detonated mines. They displaced 164 tons fully laden, were armed with a Bofors 40 mm gun and were powered by a pair of Paxman diesel engines.

Ships
 
 
 
 
 
 
 
 
  (renamed Isis)

References
 Jane's Fighting Ships 1953–54, R. V. B. Blackman (ed), Jane's Publishing, 1953
 Warships of the Royal Navy, Captain John. E. Moore RN, Jane's Publishing, 1979
 Bassingham web site

 
Ship classes of the Royal Navy